Kotovsky, is a 1942 Soviet biopic propaganda film directed by Aleksandr Faintsimmer.

Plot 
The film tells about Grigory Kotovsky, a famous participant in the Civil War, who several times managed to escape from prison and never lost on the battlefield.

Starring 
 Nikolai Mordvinov as Kotovsky (as N. Mordvinov)
 Vasili Vanin as Kharitonov (as V. Vanin)
 Nikolay Kryuchkov as Kabanyuk / Zagari (as N. Kryuchkov)
 Vera Maretskaya as The doctor (as V. Maretskaya)
 Mikhail Astangov as Knyaz Karakozen / Yego syn (as M. Astangov)
 Konstantin Sorokin as Ordinarets (as K. Sorokin)
 Evgeniy Grigorev as Selyanin (uncredited)
 Ivan Klyukvin

References

External links 
 

1942 films
1940s Russian-language films
Soviet drama films
1942 drama films
Soviet black-and-white films